Seyyed Shahab or Seyyedshahab may refer to:
 Seyyed Shahab, Hamadan
 Seyyed Shahab, Kermanshah
 Seyyed Shahab Rural District, in Hamadan Province